Picardaea is a genus of plant in the family Rubiaceae. Picardaea haitiensis is the only member of this genus and endemic to the island of Hispaniola in the Caribbean. It is listed as endangered in the red list of the Dominican Republic but is not currently assessed by the IUCN.

References

Dialypetalantheae
Monotypic Rubiaceae genera
Flora of the Dominican Republic
Flora of Haiti